Jakob Büchel (born 1955) is a politician from Liechtenstein and the former leader of the Patriotic Union (VU). Büchel was named leader of the VU on 26 September 2011 at a party convention in Balzers, to succeed then-leader Adolf Heeb.

Prior to his election as party leader, Büchel was active in municipal politics. He served as the Gemeindevorsteher (Mayor) of the municipality of Ruggell from 1999 to 2007. From 2008 to 2011 he was president of the Liechtenstein Sports Commission.

References

Patriotic Union (Liechtenstein) politicians
Members of the Landtag of Liechtenstein
Living people
1955 births